Long Marton is a village and civil parish in the Eden District of the English county of Cumbria. In 2011 the population was 827.

The village previously had a railway station called Long Marton railway station which closed in 1970. Within the parish are also the hamlets of Marton Moor and Broom. Long Marton also has a pub. Located near the A66 3 miles from Appleby-in-Westmorland - the parish of Long Marton is bounded on the east by the parish of Dufton, on the south by the parish of St. Michael's Appleby, on the west by the parish of Kirkby Thore,  and on the north by the parish of Alston Moor in the former county of Cumberland:

In the 1870s, Long Marton was described as:
MARTON (LoNG), a township and a parish in East Ward district, Westmoreland. The township lies on Trout beck, an affluent of the river Eden, 1½ mile ESE of Kirkby-Thore r. station, and 3½ NW by N of Appleby; and contains the village of Brampton-Croft's End. The parish includes also the townships of Brampton and Knock; and its Post town is Kirkby-Thore, under Penrith. Acres, 3,200. Real property of Long Marton and Knock townships, £3,402; of which £18 are in mines. Rated property of the entire parish, £5,182. ...

Population
In 2011 the population of Long Marton was 827. Throughout history Long Marton has always had a small number of residents, in 1801 there was 432 residents in the area, this increased dramatically in 1831 the population rose by 432 to 819. It slowly decreased after this climax. It fell to 587 in 1911. After World War One the Population of Long Marton slowly began to increase, in 1921 it rose to 619.

Governance
Long Marton is in the parliamentary constituency of Penrith and the Border. Neil Hudson was elected its Conservative Member of Parliament at the 2019 General Election, replacing Rory Stewart.

When the UK was a member of the EU, in the European Parliament Long Marton's residents voted to elect MEP's for the North West England constituency.

An electoral ward in the same name exists. This ward stretches east to Moor House-Upper Teesdale and had a total population taken at the 2011 Census of 1,202.

Housing types
In 2011 it was recorded that there were 165 detached houses within Long Marton, 126 semi detached houses and only 66 terraced houses within the area. In 1831 there was only 171 households within Long Marton this slowly increased by 1961 there was 198 households within Long Marton.

Occupations 
In 1831, Long Marton's main industry of employment for was within the agricultural industry. The workforce was made up of males; the data shows the majority of males over 20 were labourers within the agricultural industry. Given the terrain of Long Marton, the vast farmland surrounding the village this industry was to be expected. However, the 1831 census gave no data on the employment of women, it is to be expected that many were not employed. The 1831 The second biggest industry was retail and handicrafts. After 50 years, in 1881 Long Marton saw a change in which industry was the biggest employer. The majority of people were employed in domestic offices or service, this was no longer just males either females and males were employed within this industry.

The Queen's Head in Tirril was the original home of the Tirril Brewery which is now, despite its name, based beneath the Pennine fells in a Grade II listed red sandstone barn in the village of Long Marton.

St Margaret and St James's Parish Church 
St Margaret and St James' Church, Long Marton is an active Anglican parish church. It is located south of the village. Built in the Norman period on the site of an Anglo-Saxon church on the Institute Victorian two-storey hall.

Village Hall

The building was built in 1839 and has been serving the community since then. The hall has had several improvements and even been made eco friendly with solar panels. The solar panels were only made possible through the grant by Cumbria County Council. The hall hosts a variety of activities including the history group which meets every two months on a Tuesday. The group is now a member of Cumbria Local Federation.
 
"The organisation links the many local history societies around Cumbria with a regular newsletter & annual Conference at the University of Cumbria. Last year (2009) they agreed to support the Victoria County History of Cumbria project, & have helped set up a new Trust body, the Cumbria County History Trust (CCHT) which will raise the funds to restart & complete the massive project. The Project Leader is Dr.Angus Winchester of Lancaster University."

Marton House

Marton House was built in the 19th century, it was designed by English architect and surveyor Ignatius Bonomi. The house sits on six acres of beautiful gardens, including a croquet lawn. The house was originally built for the London Lead Company.

Location grid

See also

Listed buildings in Long Marton

References

External links
 Cumbria County History Trust: Long Marton (nb: provisional research only – see Talk page)

 
Villages in Cumbria
Civil parishes in Cumbria
Eden District